The Port of Richmond, also known as the Richmond Deepwater Terminal, is located on the James River in Richmond, Virginia, United States,  inland from Cape Henry and approximately  northwest of Newport News, Virginia. It is located at 77° 25' west latitude and 37° 27' north longitude and lies adjacent to Interstate 95. The port was built in 1940.

Description
The Port of Richmond is a domestic and international multi-modal freight and distribution center serving waterborne, rail and truck shippers throughout the mid-Atlantic region. It handles containers, breakbulk, bulk, neo-bulk and livestock cargo. The port has container and general cargo facilities on the James River and is part of a supply-chain network of over 600 warehouses.

Owned by the city of Richmond, Virginia, it is one of only a few municipality-owned ports on the Eastern Seaboard. It is governed by the Port of Richmond Commission, with day-to-day operations managed by Federal Marine Terminals, Inc. Federal Marine Terminals provides exclusive stevedoring services as well as a full range of supply-chain management services including export, packaging and transfer, as well as warehouse and inland distribution services.

Major port cargo include tobacco, tobacco products, textiles, newsprint, wastepaper, chemicals, steel, steel products, phosphates, forest products, machinery, project cargo, refractory, vehicles, pharmaceuticals, aplite and livestock.

Distribution
The port used to provide service to northern Europe, the United Kingdom, Canada, the Mediterranean, the Caribbean, Mexico and South America.

In early 2009, Independent Container Line (ICL), the port's principal carrier, discontinued its service to the Port of Richmond after more than 20 years. It continues to serve Chester, Pennsylvania, Liverpool, England and Antwerp, Belgium, and added service to Wilmington, North Carolina. Eimskip, Iceland's biggest transportation company, began service in November 2006 Eimskip - Eimskip announces new port call in USA and ended service in 2011.

References

External links
 Port of Richmond

See also
 Deepwater Terminal Railroad
 Southside (Richmond, Virginia)

Richmond
Richmond
Port of Richmond
Economy of Richmond, Virginia